Am I the Kinda Girl? is the third album by English singer-songwriter Cathy Dennis. It was released in October 1996 in Australia, and in March 1997 in the UK. Dennis abandoned the dance-pop sound of previous releases and switched to a more traditional singer-songwriter approach. The resulting album, Am I the Kinda Girl?, was more in keeping with the Britpop sound of bands such as Blur and performers such as Stephen Duffy, and features collaborations with Guy Chambers of The Lemon Trees and Andy Partridge of XTC.

Track listing
 "West End Pad" (Cathy Dennis, Mark Saunders) – 3:03
 "Fickle" (Guy Chambers, Dennis) – 3:15
 "When Dreams Turn to Dust" (Guy Chambers, Dennis) – 4:07
 "Stupid Fool" (Dennis, Mark Saunders) – 4:17
 "Am I the Kinda Girl?" (Dennis, Andy Partridge) – 3:26
 "Homing the Rocket" (Dennis, Mark Saunders) – 3:34
 "That Is Why You Love Me" (Guy Chambers, Dennis) – 3:16
 "Waterloo Sunset" (Ray Davies) – 3:39
 "Don't Take My Heaven" (Guy Chambers, Dennis) – 4:15
 "The Date" (Ray Davies, Dennis) – 4:35
 "Crazy Ones" (Dennis, Mark Saunders) – 3:00
 "Run Like a River" (Japanese bonus track) (Dennis, C. Braide) – 3:37
 "I Just Love You" (Japanese bonus track) (Dennis, F. Dunnery) – 4:46

Personnel
Personnel as per Discogs.

Cathy Dennis – vocals, keyboards, harmonica on "Crazy Ones"
Guy Chambers – guitar, keyboards, accordion on "Stupid Fool"
Mark Saunders – guitar, bass, keyboards, drum programming
Neil Conti, Tam Johnstone – drums
Melvin Duffy – steel guitar on "Fickle"
Yolanda Charles – bass guitar on "When Dreams Turn to Dust"
Dave Gregory – guitar on "Am I the Kinda Girl?"
Technical
Mark Saunders – engineer, mixer
Danton Supple – engineer
Dave Burnham, Glenn Skinner – drum recordings
Mark "Spike" Stent – mixing
Ellen von Unwerth – cover photography

Charts

Non album tracks

Recorded as part of the same sessions, Dennis released the following as b-sides to the singles for the album.

Fade Away
Roller Coaster
Consolation
Sunny Afternoon
I Just Love You
Baggage
Falling (new recording)
Too many walls (new recording)

Unreleased tracks
In May 2021, Mark Saunders who worked with Dennis on the album, post short samples of further tracks indicating that there was more unreleased material.  Further discussion revealed more content is unreleased than the tracks Mark Saunders has given in the sample/worked on.

The track titles of the songs

 Cars And Boats
 Somebody
 Nothing I Can Do
 Stop
 Half Of Me Is Reality
 These Arms
 Keep You For Myself
 Conscious Of Myself
 I'm A Sailor
 Tempted To Stray
 Yesterday's News

References

1996 albums
Cathy Dennis albums
Albums produced by Mark Saunders (record producer)
Polydor Records albums